The AsiaBasket, organized as Filbasket in the Philippines, is an Asian professional basketball league founded in 2021. 

It was founded as the Filipino Basketball League (Filbasket), a domestic basketball tournament in the Philippines. Its first tournament was the Subic Championship held in 2021. It was followed by the Summer Championship the following year. In the same year, the Filbasket expanded overseas, holding the International Championship in Kuala Lumpur, Malaysia where teams from other Southeast Asia also taking part.

In 2023, the league renamed itself as AsiaBasket with a second international tournament planned for April in Malaysia. The league retained its Filbasket branding for future tournaments planned to be held in the Philippines.

History

Domestic tournament era
The Filipino Basketball League (Filbasket) was established by former UAAP college player Jai Reyes and Buddy Encarnado of the Pasig Sta. Lucia Realtors in 2021. It was founded as a means to provide a platform for basketball players whose careers were disrupted by the COVID-19 pandemic community quarantine measures. This includes players of the Maharlika Pilipinas Basketball League (MPBL) which saw its 2019–20 season delayed due to COVID-19 measures. Hence many teams from the MPBL have joined the FilBasket, while not leaving the former, in a bid to play more competitive games.

The Games and Amusements Board (GAB) of the Philippine government contends that Filbasket is a professional league and not an amateur league as the league organizers believe, hence the league falls under its jurisdiction. The FilBasket organizers admitted that the long-term plan is for the league to become a professional league although it maintains that it will be an amateur league initially. The dispute was reportedly resolved in October 2021, with FilBasket pushing through with its first tournament, the FilBasket Subic Championship. Filbasket secured approval from SBMA and the IATF for a bubble tournament at the Subic Bay Gymnasium, in accordance to regulations for amateur leagues.

The Filbasket Subic Championship concluded with AICC Manila being the winners. However the GAB issued a cease and desist order insisting that Filbasket is a professional league and declared the tournament held last year as unlawful although it did not impose any further sanctions.

Filbasket started the process of turning into a professional league recognized by the GAB on February 22, 2022. By March 1, 2022, the league was already granted professional status by the GAB. The league would hold its first professional tournament, the Filbasket Summer Championship, in early 2022.

Asian expansion
Filbasket would also hold its first international tournament, the Filbasket International Championship in the latter part of 2022 in Malaysia.

On March 3, 2023, Filbasket announced their rebranding, they will be known as AsiaBasket. The rebranding was made to accommodate expansion to Asian basketball market. They will retain the Filbasket name for local competitions in the Philippines.

Teams

International teams
Teams competed at the Filbasket International Championship (2022):

Philippine domestic teams
Teams which had took part in Filbasket teams which played in past domestic tournaments in the Philippines.

Venues

Champions

See also
 Philippine Basketball Association
 NBL
 Pilipinas Super League
 Pilipinas VisMin Super Cup
 Chooks-to-Go Pilipinas 3x3

References 

2021 establishments in the Philippines
Sports leagues established in 2021
Basketball leagues in the Philippines